Everett Leo Shostrom was a  well known American psychotherapist. His approach to psychotherapy was more eclectic than was then normal integrating a wide range of theory, practice, and research. He was perhaps most well known for his film Three Approaches to Psychotherapy and his famous book Man, the Manipulator. He also produced some well known "tests" and "inventories". These include the following: the Personal Orientation Inventory, Personal Orientation Dimensions, the Pair Attraction Inventory, and the Caring Relationship Inventory.

Three Approaches to Psychotherapy 
Shostrom in 1965 produced a series of videoed therapy sessions between "Gloria", one of his patients, and three of the leading psychotherapists of that time;  Carl Rogers, Fritz Perls and Albert Ellis. Each therapist took a different approach to help Gloria, a real person, with her problems -  in particular discussing the need to be sensitive to her young daughter while dating again after her divorce. The approaches taken by the three therapists were respectively a Person-centered therapy, Gestalt therapy, and Rational Emotive Behavior Therapy. The film has been widely used as a training aid for counselors and therapists.

Personal Orientation Inventory
The Personal Orientation Inventory is a system developed by Shostrom (1963) to measure factors related to self-actualisation. It uses 120 pairs of choice items to make up ten sub-scales. With these scales being designed to address various aspects of the systems of personal values being held by the subject. The instruments were chosen on the basis of value concepts which he saw as having wide personal and social relevance. His claim was that it is suitable for, and it has been used in, a wide range of different areas. These include colleges, businesses, clinics as well as with counselors.

Selected publications 
 Shostrom, E. L. (1967). Man, the manipulator: the inner journey from manipulation to actualization. Nashville, Abingdon Press.
 Brammer, L. M., & Shostrom, E. L. (1968). Therapeutic psychology; fundamentals of actualization counseling and psychotherapy. Englewood Cliffs, N.J., Prentice-Hall.

References

20th-century American psychologists